Rusalka (Mermaid), was one of two s built for the Imperial Russian Navy in the 1860s. She served for her entire career with the Baltic Fleet. Aside from hitting an uncharted rock not long after she was completed in 1869, she had an uneventful career. Rusalka sank in a storm in 1893 with the loss of all hands in the Gulf of Finland. In 1902, a memorial was built in Reval (Tallinn) to commemorate her loss. Her wreck was rediscovered in 2003, bow-down in the mud, which has prompted a new theory regarding her loss.

Design and description
The ship was designed to displace , but turned out to be overweight and actually displaced . Her crew numbered 13 officers and 171 crewmen in 1877.

The ship had two simple horizontal direct-acting steam engines, each driving a single propeller. The engines were designed to produce a total of  using steam provided by two coal-fired rectangular fire-tube boilers, but only achieved  and a speed of approximately  during her sea trials.

Rusalka was initially armed with a pair of  rifled Model 1867 guns in the forward gun turret and a pair of  smoothbore Rodman guns in the aft turret. The Rodman guns were replaced by a pair of Obukhov  rifled guns in 1871 and all of the nine-inch guns were replaced in their turn by longer, more powerful nine-inch Obukhov guns in 1878–79. No light guns for use against torpedo boats are known to have been fitted aboard the ship before the 1870s when she received 3 four-pounder  guns mounted on the turret tops as well as a variety of smaller guns that included  Engström quick-firing (QF) guns,  Nordenfelt guns, single-barreled QF  Hotchkiss guns and QF  Hotchkiss revolving cannon.

Construction and service
Rusalka, named after the mythological creature, was ordered on 25 January 1865 and construction began on 10 June at the Admiralty Shipyard, Saint Petersburg, although the formal keel-laying was not until 6 June 1866. She was launched on 12 September 1867 and completed in 1869 at the cost of 762,000 rubles. Construction was considerably delayed by late deliveries of drawings, material, and the death of her original builder. The ship struck an uncharted rock off the Finnish coast in June 1869 and damaged her bottom plating badly enough that she had to be run aground to prevent her from sinking. Rusalka served her entire career with the Baltic Fleet and was assigned to the Artillery Training Detachment in March 1870. The ship had her boilers replaced in 1878 and 1891 and she was reclassified as a coast-defense ironclad on 13 February 1892.

Sinking
Rusalka, under the command of Captain 2nd Rank V. Kh. Ienish sailed from Reval harbor at 08:30 on 7 September 1893, bound for Helsingfors (Helsinki). She was escorted by the gunboat Tucha (Cloud) under Captain 2nd Rank N. M. Lushkov. Several hours after their departure the weather deteriorated into a storm, with gale force winds and rain; Tucha lost her charge from sight around noon, but sailed on and arrived safely at Helsingfors.

No trace of the monitor was found until the corpse of a sailor in a dinghy and a few lifebuoys washed ashore on the Finnish island of Kremare. Extensive searches of the sea bottom also failed to locate the ship. In January 1894 a commission appointed to investigate convened and reprimanded Rear Admiral P. S. Burachek, commander of the detachment, for letting Rusalka go to sea in bad weather as well as Lushkov for losing contact with the monitor. The commission concluded that the ship's steering gear failed or that water had entered the ship and caused her to lose power. Either would have caused Rusalka to turn parallel to the waves where her superstructure would have been demolished and extensive flooding would have soon overwhelmed her small reserve of buoyancy. Whatever the cause, Rusalka obviously broached and sank with the loss of all 177 members of her crew.

Monument

On 7 September 1902, the ninth anniversary of the loss of the ship, a monument to Rusalka (Estonian transliteration from Russian: Russalka) was erected in Tallinn. Sculpted by Amandus Adamson, it takes the form of a bronze angel standing on a granite pedestal.

Discovery
The wreck of Rusalka was claimed to have been found by divers of the Soviet EPRON salvage agency in 1932, but they made no attempt to salvage it. EPRON's location does not match that of the ship as discovered in 2003.

In spring 2003, a joint project was launched by the Estonian Maritime Museum and the commercial diving company Tuukritööde OÜ with the aim of finding Rusalka which had sunk 110 years earlier. Two days later, deep divers Kaido Peremees and Indrek Ostrat more precisely located and videoed the wreck. Most unusually, the wreck is in a near-vertical position; following her sinking, the vessel plunged, bow first,  directly downward into the muddy bottom of the gulf, and is buried in the bottom to almost half her length.

The wreck is generally intact although draped with snagged fishing nets. The aft turret, however, has fallen out off the ship. The vertical position of the wreck has inspired a new theory of her loss by nautical archaeologist Vello Mäss. He believes that Rusalka was taking on water forward, perhaps from a leak or through ventilation hatches and was bow-heavy when her captain decided to make a turn, possibly to return to Reval, and the ship capsized during the turn with her engines still running. Her forward speed and flooded forward hull meant that she descended vertically and drove her hull into the muddy sea bottom.

Notes

Footnotes

Bibliography

Further reading

External links 

 Башенная броненосная лодка "Русалка" 
 From "Mermaid" - to the "Kursk" 

Ships of the Imperial Russian Navy
Shipwrecks in the Gulf of Finland
1867 ships
Maritime incidents in 1893
Maritime incidents in Estonia
Charodeika-class monitors
Ships built at Admiralty Shipyard
Ships lost with all hands